Turbulence Bluffs is a three high bluffs with vertical faces on the northwest but merging with the ice sheet on the southeast, standing along the east side of Robert Glacier 16 nautical miles (30 km) northeast of Rayner Peak in Enderby Land. Mapped from ANARE (Australian National Antarctic Research Expeditions) surveys and air photos, 1954–66. So named by ANARE because of severe turbulence encountered while attempting a helicopter landing in 1965.

Cliffs of Antarctica
Landforms of Enderby Land